Grishinsky is a rural locality (a khutor) in Sulyayevskoye Rural Settlement, Kumylzhensky District, Volgograd Oblast, Russia. The population was 143 as of 2010.

Geography 
Grishinsky is located in forest steppe, on Khopyorsko-Buzulukskaya Plain, 30 km northwest of Kumylzhenskaya (the district's administrative centre) by road. Ilmenevsky is the nearest rural locality.

References 

Rural localities in Kumylzhensky District